Ganter may refer to:

Ganter (surname)
Ganter Brewery, Freiburg, Germany

Ships
, a German cargo ship in service from 1927 to 1939
SS Ganter, a military transport of Germania, built in 1943. She was captured by Soviet troops in Bulgaria and became a Soviet gunboat. In November 1944, she was transferred to the Black Sea Shipping Company as cargo ship and was renamed Феолент. To see photo and information here: http://mmflot.com/forum/gallery/image_page.php?album_id=12&image_id=9028

See also
Canter (disambiguation)